Ronald Fricke is a German ichthyologist and researcher of biodiversity at the State Museum of Natural History Stuttgart. As of 2022, Fricke authored 8 families, 10 genera and 186 species within the families of Callionymidae, Gobiesocidae, Ophichthidae, Tripterygiidae and other families.

He is a co-editor of Eschmeyer's Catalog of Fishes; among his current tasks is the building of a digital ichthyological literature archive.

Publications
See Wikispecies below.

Taxon described by him
See :Category:Taxa named by Ronald Fricke

References

External links 

Living people
Year of birth missing (living people)
Taxon authorities
German ichthyologists
21st-century German zoologists
Scientists from Stuttgart